Donald Reed Harnby (20 July 1923 – 24 October 2009) was an English professional footballer who played as a full-back in the Football League for York City and Grimsby Town, in non-League football for Spennymoor United, and was on the books of Newcastle United without making a league appearance. He played wartime football for Middlesbrough.

References

1923 births
People from Hurworth-on-Tees
Footballers from County Durham
2009 deaths
English footballers
Association football fullbacks
Spennymoor United F.C. players
Newcastle United F.C. players
York City F.C. players
Grimsby Town F.C. players
English Football League players
Middlesbrough F.C. wartime guest players